The Stellako River is an  long river in the Nechako Plateau region of the Canadian province of British Columbia. It flows from François Lake to Fraser Lake, which joins the Nechako River via the short Nautley River. The Nechako is a tributary of the Fraser River.

See also
List of British Columbia rivers

References

Nechako Country
Rivers of British Columbia
Tributaries of the Fraser River
Range 5 Coast Land District
Range 4 Coast Land District